Schenella pityophila is a species of fungus in the family Geastraceae found in Europe. It was originally described in 1997 as Pyrenogaster pityophilus, before being transferred to the genus Schenella in 2005.

References

Fungi described in 1977
Fungi of Europe
Geastraceae